Maal og Minne ("Language and Memory") is a Norwegian academic journal of linguistics established in 1909 by Magnus Olsen. It covers research on Scandinavian languages,  focusing mainly on language history and philology. It is a "level 2" journal in the Norwegian Scientific Index. The current editors-in-chief are Lars S. Vikør and Jon Gunnar Jørgensen.

Editors 
The following persons are or have been editors of the journal:
 1909–1950 Magnus Olsen
 1951–1967 Trygve Knudsen and Ludvig Holm-Olsen
 1968–1984 Ludvig Holm-Olsen and Einar Lundeby
 1985–1993 Einar Lundeby and Bjarne Fidjestøl
 1994 Einar Lundeby
 1995 Einar Lundeby and Odd Einar Haugen
 1996–2005 Kjell Ivar Vannebo and Odd Einar Haugen
 2006–present Lars S. Vikør and Jon Gunnar Jørgensen

References

External links 
 

Linguistics journals
Multilingual journals
Publications established in 1909
Biannual journals